The Gaesatae or Gaesati (Greek Γαισάται) were a group of Gallic mercenary warriors who lived in the Alps near the river Rhône and fought against the Roman Republic at the Battle of Telamon in 225 BC.

According to some scholars, the Gaesatae may be identified with the Allobroges, who first appeared in the same region only a few years later in connection with Hannibal's crossing of the Alps in 218 BC.

Etymology 
The Gaulish name Gaisatai literally means '(armed) with javelins' or 'spearmen', and derives from the Celtic noun *gaisos, meaning 'spear, javelin'. It is cognate with the Old Irish gaiscedach ('armed person, warrior, champion'), from gaisced ('weapons, arms'), itself from gáe ('spear, javelin'). The stem gaisat- can also be found in the Gaulish proper nouns Gaesatus, Gesatus, Gesatius, or Gesatia, as well as in the compound Gesato-rix, meaning 'king-spear', or 'king-javelin'. The Greek historian Polybius interpreted Gaisatai as meaning 'mercenaries'.

History 
According to Polybius' account, the Boii and Insubres of Cisalpine Gaul paid the Gaesatae, under their leaders Concolitanus and Aneroëstes, large sums of money to fight against the Romans, in response to the Roman colonisation of the former Gallic territory of Picenum. The Gauls overran and defeated a Roman army on the approach to Rome, but when the consul Lucius Aemilius Papus arrived with his troops, the Gauls followed Aneroëstes' advice to withdraw with their booty. Papus pursued them, and the other consul Gaius Atilius Regulus cut them off at Telamon in Etruria.

Polybius describes how the Gaesatae fought at the front, and unlike their Gallic allies who fought in trousers and light cloaks, they went into battle naked, both because of their great confidence and their desire not to get their clothes caught in the brambles. Diodorus Siculus also reports that some Gauls fought naked, trusting in the protection of nature. The appearance and the gestures of the naked warriors in front, 8 all in the prime of life, and finely built men, and all in the leading companies richly adorned with gold torques and armlets. The sight of them indeed dismayed the Romans, but at the same time the prospect of winning such spoils made them twice as keen for the fight, but their small shields offered little protection against Roman javelins, and the Gaesatae were driven back and their allies slaughtered. Concolitanus was captured. Aneroëstes escaped with a few followers and killed himself. In 222 BC the Gaesatae were hired again, but the Gallic forces were defeated by the Roman cavalry at Clastidium in the territory of the Insubres. According to Plutarch, in his Life of Marcellus, the Gaesatae numbered 30,000 as they crossed the Alps, of whom 10,000 fought at Clastidium.

The Gaesatae have been compared with the medieval Irish fianna, who were mythical small war-bands of landless young men operating independently of any kingdom.

References

Bibliography 

 

Celtic warriors
Gaulish people
Mercenary units and formations of antiquity
3rd century BC in the Roman Republic